Euchrysops cyclopteris is a butterfly in the family Lycaenidae. It is found in Cameroon, the Central African Republic, Sudan and Ethiopia.

References

Butterflies described in 1876
Euchrysops
Butterflies of Africa
Taxa named by Arthur Gardiner Butler